South of Sideways is the third studio album by American hard rock band Edgewater, released on April 6, 2004. It is the band's first album on a major label and includes tracks from their previous independent albums.

Musically, the album incorporates heavy guitar riffing, akin to Edgewater's numerous contemporaries, with an emphasis on melody. Digital effects are also evident in the background of various tracks. Moseman's vocals typically dwell in the realm of clean or heated singing but occasional boast drawn-out screams which give the album its alternative metal and nu metal edge.

The album's lone single, "Eyes Wired Shut", was included on the soundtrack for the 2004 film The Punisher. It was also the official theme song for WWE Backlash 2004.

Track listing
All music written by Edgewater. 
"Inhale"  – 3:30
"Science of It All"  – 3:55
"Eyes Wired Shut"  – 3:16
"Neglected"  – 4:10
"Break Me Out"  – 3:54
"The Story of..."  – 3:17
"Tres Quatros"  – 5:32
"Sweet Suffocation"  – 3:16
"One Perfect Something"  – 3:38
"Circles"  – 3:53
"Quitter"  – 4:16
"Lifter"  – 5:05

Personnel
Matt Moseman - vocals
Justin Middleton - guitar
Micah Creel - guitar
Ricky Wolking - bass
Jeremy "Worm" Rees - drums

References

Edgewater (band) albums
2004 albums
Wind-up Records albums